= Mohra Ghamiaran =

- Town
- Location within Pakistan
- Coordinates: 33.25°N 73.24°E
- Country: Pakistan
- Province: (Islamabad Capital Territory) Islamabad C.T
- Elevation: 512 m (1,680 ft)

Population
  - Total: 59,620
- Time zone: UTC+5 (PST)

Mohra Ghamiaran is a town in the Islamabad Capital Territory of Pakistan. It is located at 33° 25' 0N 73° 24' 20E with an altitude of 512 metres (1683 feet).
